Antonis Kalogiannis (3 August 1933 – 11 February 2021) was a Greek singer.

Biography
In 1966, Kalogiannis met with composer Mikis Theodorakis, who helped launch his career. During the Greek junta, he went into exile and recorded protest songs with Maria Farantouri. During the 1980s, he established himself as a love singer.

On 11 February 2021, Antonis Kalogiannis died of a heart attack at the age of 87.

Discography
 Κάτι φταίει
 Τα πρώτα μου τραγούδια
 Ερωτικά
 Συνοικισμός Α (1972)
 Για μια σταγόνα αλάτι (1973)
 Τα λιοτρόπια (1974)
 Τι ώρα νά 'ναι
 Τραγούδια Μ. Θεοδωράκη
 Γράμματα στο Μακρυγιάννη (1979)
 Τα σημερινά (1981)
 Μικραίνει ο κόσμος (1983)
 Μικρά Ερωτικά (1984)
 Και που λες Ευτυχία (1985)
 Επικινδυνα παιχνιδια (1990)
 Σε ανύποπτο χρόνο (1991)
 Αντίθετη Πορεία (1993)
 Ιστορίες αγγέλων (1997)

References

External links
 
 

1940 births
2021 deaths
20th-century Greek male singers
Musicians from Athens
Greek exiles
Place of death missing